Absinthe: La Folie Verte is a collaboration of Blood Axis and LJDLP celebrating the virtues of absinthe.  The complete tracks from ATNR 016. Tracks 1-10 recorded live in Sintra, Portugal, 22 Oct. 2001. Released by Athanor.

Track listing
"La Folie Verte" – 2:12
"Variations Musicales" – 2:03
"Au Fond Du Verre" – 0:47
"Absinthe Patriote" – 7:07
"Minutes D'Absinthe" – 1:09
"Avec Les Fleurs" – 1:56
"L'Oxygenee" – 2:35
"Absinthe Eternelle" – 2:55
"Folie Verte" – 2:59
"La Buveuse D'Absinthe" – 5:27
"La Folie Verte" – 3:36
"Absinthia Taetra" – 5:10
"Avec Les Fleurs, Avec Les Femmes..." – 6:11
"Sur Le Theme De Corelli, Variations Musicales" – 7:38
"Bois Ton Absinthe" – 0:56
"A Ta Sante Mon Brave" – 5:25
"Fee Verte,Que Vous Etes Jolie" – 2:15

External links
 http://www.discogs.com/release/309450

Experimental music albums
Blood Axis albums